Dušan Šimočko (born 29 September 1983) is a Slovak biathlete.

Life and career
He has represented Slovakia at 2006 and 2010 Winter Olympics, achieving 18th place at Men's 20 kilometres event at 2010 Olympics. He debuted in the Biathlon World Cup in 2002–03 season in Östersund. His best World Cup overall finish was 63rd in the 2009–10 season.

Biathlon results
All results are sourced from the International Biathlon Union.

Olympic Games

World Championships

*During Olympic seasons competitions are only held for those events not included in the Olympic program.

Junior World Championships

References

External links
 

1983 births
Living people
Sportspeople from Banská Bystrica
Slovak male biathletes
Biathletes at the 2006 Winter Olympics
Biathletes at the 2010 Winter Olympics
Olympic biathletes of Slovakia